Ben Platt Live from Radio City Music Hall is a 2020 American concert film by actor, singer and songwriter Ben Platt. The film documents the final stop of his debut Sing to Me Instead Tour, in which the one-night-only event was recorded live on September 29, 2019, at Radio City Music Hall in New York City. The special, directed by Alex Timbers and Sam Wrench, and executive produced by Platt, Timbers, Ben Winston, Lee Lodge, Adam Mersel and Heather Reynolds, was released on Netflix on May 20, 2020.

Cast
 Ben Platt

Background Singers
 Crystal Monee Hall
 Kojo Littles
 Allen René Louis

Musicians
 David Cook - Musical Director/Piano
 Mike Ricchiuti - Keyboards
 Nir Felder - Guitarist
 Justin Goldner - Guitarist
 Amanda Lo - Violin
 Reenat Pinchas – Cello
 Julia Adamy - Bassist
 Derrick Wright - Drums

Song list

 "Bad Habit"
 "Temporary Love"
 "Honest Man"
 "Hurt Me Once"
 "New"
 "The Joke" (Brandi Carlile cover)
 "Better"
 "Share Your Address"
 "Ease My Mind"
 "Rain"
 "In Case You Don't Live Forever"
 "Take Me to the Pilot" (Elton John cover)
 "Grow as We Go"
 "Older"
 "Run Away"

Notes
 Platt's cover of Stevie Wonder's "Overjoyed," while performed at the concert, is not featured in the special.

References

External links
 
 Ben Platt Live from Radio City Music Hall on Netflix
 

2020 films
Concert films
2020 LGBT-related films
American LGBT-related films
Gay-related films
Films shot in New York City
Netflix specials
Radio City Music Hall
2020s English-language films
2020s American films